= Mita Review =

Magazine of Keio University

Mita Review (三田評論, Mita Hyōron) is the Japanese-language magazine of Keio University.

The magazine has been published since 1898, which was the 40th year of Keio University. The name was established in January 1915. Publication became difficult after the 1923 Great Kantō earthquake. Publication was also interrupted in December, 1943 during World War II, and resumed in October 1951. The journal published its 1000th issue in 1998.

The magazine is published online as Mita Hyōron ONLINE (三田評論 ONLINE).
